Russley is a suburb on the western side of Christchurch city. 

The suburb is named after Russley Farm, which was owned by William Chisnell (1827–1876) but sold shortly before his death.

Demographics

Hawthornden had a population of 2,493 at the 2018 New Zealand census, a decrease of 18 people (-0.7%) since the 2013 census, and an increase of 51 people (2.1%) since the 2006 census. There were 933 households. There were 1,218 males and 1,272 females, giving a sex ratio of 0.96 males per female. The median age was 37.6 years (compared with 37.4 years nationally), with 471 people (18.9%) aged under 15 years, 504 (20.2%) aged 15 to 29, 1,098 (44.0%) aged 30 to 64, and 426 (17.1%) aged 65 or older.

Ethnicities were 75.0% European/Pākehā, 8.2% Māori, 3.5% Pacific peoples, 19.6% Asian, and 3.0% other ethnicities (totals add to more than 100% since people could identify with multiple ethnicities).

The proportion of people born overseas was 29.1%, compared with 27.1% nationally.

Although some people objected to giving their religion, 47.1% had no religion, 39.7% were Christian, 2.3% were Hindu, 1.4% were Muslim, 1.0% were Buddhist and 2.4% had other religions.

Of those at least 15 years old, 540 (26.7%) people had a bachelor or higher degree, and 261 (12.9%) people had no formal qualifications. The median income was $32,800, compared with $31,800 nationally. The employment status of those at least 15 was that 993 (49.1%) people were employed full-time, 312 (15.4%) were part-time, and 72 (3.6%) were unemployed.

Education
Russley School Te Paritō Kōwhai is a full primary school catering for years 1 to 8.

References

Suburbs of Christchurch
Populated places in Canterbury, New Zealand